Kazuki Kondoh (近藤 一樹, born July 8, 1983) is a Japanese professional baseball pitcher for the Kagawa Olive Guyners of the Shikoku Island League Plus. He has played in Nippon Professional Baseball (NPB) for the Osaka Kintetsu Buffaloes, Orix Buffaloes and Tokyo Yakult Swallows.

Career

On December 2, 2020, he become free agent.

On January 4, 2021, Kondoh signed with Kagawa Olive Guyners of the Shikoku Island League Plus, as a player-coach.

References

External links

NPB.com

1983 births
Living people
Baseball people from Kanagawa Prefecture
Japanese baseball players
Nippon Professional Baseball pitchers
Osaka Kintetsu Buffaloes players
Orix Buffaloes players
People from Sagamihara
Tokyo Yakult Swallows players